St. Luke's Chapel is a historic chapel located in Rutherfordton, Rutherford County, North Carolina.

The chapel was commissioned by Dr. and Mrs. Henry Norris of Philadelphia, founders of Rutherford Hospital, to serve its staff and patients, arising out of the Social Gospel Movement.
 
Completed in 1908, it is a small, one-story, frame, vernacular Gothic Revival style gable-front building. A one-story gable-roofed frame wing was added about 1915. It was restored in 1945 and again in 1965, and had its exterior renovated in 1991. It is the oldest building on the grounds of Rutherford Hospital, and the only remaining original building.

It was added to the National Register of Historic Places in 1991.

References

Churches on the National Register of Historic Places in North Carolina
Churches completed in 1908
Churches in Rutherford County, North Carolina
Carpenter Gothic church buildings in North Carolina
National Register of Historic Places in Rutherford County, North Carolina
1908 establishments in North Carolina
Rutherfordton, North Carolina